Nor Amanos is a village in the Ashtarak Municipality of the Aragatsotn Province of Armenia. It was founded as a sovkhoz (collective farm).

References 

Report of the results of the 2001 Armenian Census

Populated places in Aragatsotn Province